Harry "Hap" Y. McSween is Chancellor's Professor Emeritus of Planetary Geoscience at the University of Tennessee at Knoxville. He has published papers and popular books about meteorites and planetary exploration, and textbooks on geochemistry and cosmochemistry.

Biography
Harry Y. McSween Jr. was born September 29, 1945 in Charlotte, North Carolina. After finishing school he attended The Citadel, where he graduated with a B.S. in chemistry in 1967. He then pursued an M.S. in geology at the University of Georgia, where he graduated in 1969. The title of his thesis was "Petrological and geochemical studies in the Coronaca area, Greenwood County, South Carolina". He then joined the Air Force where he was a pilot flying C-141 aircraft around the world.

After his military service he went on to Harvard, where he became John A. Wood's first graduate student. It was here that Edward Stolper and he came up with the idea that some meteorites might originate from Mars. After graduating with a PhD in 1977, he joined the faculty of the University of Tennessee.  He became involved with the Mars Pathfinder mission in 1997 as a member of the science team, then on the team for Mars Global Surveyor. Since then McSween has been a co-investigator on the Mars Odyssey, Mars Exploration Rovers and Dawn asteroid orbiter missions.

McSween has been the elected President of the Meteoritical Society, Chair of the Planetary Division of the Geological Society of America, and Councilor and President of the Geological Society of America. He has also served on numerous advisory committees for NASA and the National Research Council. In 2021, McSween was elected into the membership of the National Academy of Sciences.

He has received  the Leonard Medal from the Meteoritical Society, the Leconte Medal from the South Carolina Science Council, the J. Lawrence Smith Medal from the U.S. National Academy of Sciences, and the Whipple Award of the Planetary Science Division of the American Geophysical Union. In 2013, he was named the Southeastern Conference (SEC) Universities Professor of the Year.

McSween also has an asteroid named for him: 5223 McSween (1981 EX6).

Publications

Books

Peer-reviewed journal articles
He is the author of over 300 peer-reviewed journal articles, of which the most cited are: 
What we have learned about Mars from SNC meteorites by McSween Jr, H.Y. Meteoritics Volume 29, Issue 6, 1994, Pages 757-779 ( cited  282 times)
The chemical composition of martian soil and rocks returned by the mobile alpha proton x-ray spectrometer: Preliminary results from the x-ray mode" by Rieder, R.a, Economou, T., Wänke, H., Turkevich, A., Crisp, J.c, Brückner, J., Dreibus, G., McSween Jr., H.Y.  Science Volume 278, Issue 5344, December 5, 1997, Pages 1771-1774. (cited 227 times)

See also
 Glossary of meteoritics

References

American geologists
Living people
Meteorite researchers
1945 births
The Citadel, The Military College of South Carolina alumni
University of Georgia alumni
Harvard University alumni
Educators from North Carolina
University of Tennessee faculty
People from Charlotte, North Carolina
Presidents of the Geological Society of America
Planetary scientists
Members of the United States National Academy of Sciences